Wang Chien-shien (born 7 August 1938) is a Taiwanese politician who is the founder of the New Party. He was finance minister of the Republic of China from 1990 to 1992 and is the chairman of the Chinese Management Association (CMA) (since 1990). Wang was the President of the Control Yuan from August 2008 to August 2014.

Early life
Born in Hefei, Anhui, Wang grew up in Taipei and received a bachelor's degree from National Cheng Kung University and a master's degree from National Chengchi University.

Political career
Wang was popular in the 1990s for his clean reputation and split with the Kuomintang to help found the New Party. In 1998, Wang joined the election for the Mayor of Taipei under New Party. However, he lost to Ma Ying-jeou of the Kuomintang.

In 2001, the three parties of the pan-Blue coalition, the Kuomintang, the People First Party, and the New Party agreed to field only one candidate for Taipei County magistrate in 2001 based on which party could field the most popular candidate in polls. Despite the unified ticket and a poll predicting him winning, Wang lost to Su Tseng-chang. He also participated in the 1998 Taipei City mayoral race. Wang is married to Su Fa-jau.

In July 2008 Wang was nominated by President Ma and approved by the Legislative Yuan to become the President of the Control Yuan.

References

 WANG, Chien-Shien International Who's Who. accessed September 1, 2006.

1938 births
Living people
New Party Members of the Legislative Yuan
National Cheng Kung University alumni
Politicians from Hefei
Republic of China politicians from Anhui
Taiwanese Ministers of Finance
Taipei Members of the Legislative Yuan
Taiwanese Presidents of the Control Yuan
Members of the 2nd Legislative Yuan
Taiwanese people from Anhui
Taiwanese political party founders
Leaders of the New Party (Taiwan)